Paula Spencer is a novel by Irish writer Roddy Doyle, published in 2006.

Plot summary
The novel is a sequel to Doyle's 1996 book The Woman Who Walked Into Doors, describing the life of alcoholic and battered wife Paula Spencer. The second book picks up her life ten years after the death of her husband.

References 

2006 Irish novels
Novels by Roddy Doyle
Sequel novels
Jonathan Cape books